Raccoon Creek is a  tributary of the Delaware River in Gloucester County, New Jersey.

Location
Raccoon Creek rises to the west of Glassboro, and flows west, meeting Cartwheel Brook at Wrights Mill. Just below, it is impounded to form Gilman Lake. It turns to the north and is again dammed to form Ewan Lake. Clems Run and Miery Run empty into the stream, which is steeply banked on the east side. It flows through Mullica Hill (formerly the head of navigation), where it is dammed to form Mullica Hill Pond, and turns west again, flowing through a wide but steep valley. Flowing along the north side of Swedesboro, the creek becomes tidal and passes under the Locke Avenue Bridge, a swing bridge replaced in 2002 by a fixed span. The creek turns north again and meanders through the marshlands, passing under the (fixed) Interstate 295 bridge and running along the west side of the Pureland Industrial Complex, one of the largest industrial parks in the United States. A tangle of marshy channels leads to the west side of Bridgeport, where the creek passes under moveable spans of the Conrail's Penns Grove Secondary and U.S. Route 130. It empties into the Delaware River just south of the Commodore Barry Bridge where it crosses Raccoon Island (now connected to the mainland by fill).

History
During the 17th century, Swedish settlers from the Swedish colony of New Sweden came upstream along Raccoon Creek to found and settle the communities of Bridgeport (originally called New Stockholm) and Swedesboro.<ref>The Swedes and Finns in New Jersey: Federal Writers' Project of WPA. Bayonne, New Jersey: Jersey Printing Company, Inc. 1938)</ref>

Tributaries
 South Branch (Raccoon Creek)
 Miery Run
 Clems Run
 Cartwheel Brook

See also
 List of rivers of New Jersey

References

External links
Jordan, John W. A History of Delaware County, Pennsylvania''.  (Lewis Historical Publishing Company, New York. 1914)
 U.S. Geological Survey: NJ stream gaging stations

Tributaries of the Delaware River
Rivers of Gloucester County, New Jersey
Rivers of New Jersey
Swedish American culture in New Jersey